Mustapha Mansouri (born 22 August 1953 in Tiztoutin) is a Moroccan politician of the National Rally of Independents party. He held a number of portfolios in the cabinets of Driss Jettou (2002–2007) and  Abderrahman el-Yousfi (1998–2000). He also was leader of his party and presided over the House of Representatives of Morocco, before resigning from both positions because of a feud with Fouad Ali El Himma.

Mustapha Mansouri holds a bachelor's degree and a PhD in economics.

Since  he is ambassador in Riyadh.

See also
Mimoun Mansouri, his older brother
Cabinet of Morocco

References

Government ministers of Morocco
1953 births
Living people
People from Nador
Riffian people
Mohammed V University alumni
Moroccan economists
Presidents of the House of Representatives (Morocco)
National Rally of Independents politicians
Ambassadors of Morocco
Ambassadors of Morocco to Saudi Arabia